Swale is a local government district with borough status in Kent, England and is bounded by Medway to the west, Canterbury to the east,  Ashford to the south and Maidstone to the south west. Its council is based in Sittingbourne. The district is named after the narrow channel called The Swale, that separates the mainland of Kent from the Isle of Sheppey, and which occupies the central part of the district.

The district was formed in 1974 under the Local Government Act 1972, from the Borough of Faversham; the Borough of Queenborough-in-Sheppey, which covered the whole of Sheppey; the Sittingbourne and Milton Urban District; and Swale Rural District.

Most of the southern half of the Borough lies within the Kent Downs Area of Outstanding Natural Beauty, whilst Sittingbourne and the Isle of Sheppey forms the concluding part of the Thames Gateway growth area.

There are four towns in the borough: Sittingbourne and Faversham on the mainland, and Sheerness and Queenborough on Sheppey.

Economy
Swale is a mainly rural borough, containing a high proportion of the UK's apple, pear, cherry and plum orchards (the North Kent Fruit Belt), as well as many of its remaining hop gardens. Faversham has the Shepherd Neame brewery.

Sheerness is a busy port and previously produced steel. Sittingbourne has a variety of smaller industrial sites.

Transport
The Roman Watling Street passed through the area, as witness the straightness of the A2 main road, now by-passed by the M2 motorway.

Governance

Chairmen
 1973-74 R. D. Sharrock
 1974-75 R. D. Sharrock
 1975-76 K. H. Burbidge
 1976-77 R. W. Barnicott

Mayors

Honorary Freemen of the Borough
 1978 D. Allen
 1982 Mrs D. M. Elvy JP DL
 1986 Bob Geldof  
 2004 Gerald David Thomsett
 2004 Peter James Salmon
 2018 Stephen Mark Brown
 2021 Peter Morgan 
 2021 Robin Castle

Elections

Swale Borough Council is elected every four years, with currently 47 councillors being elected at each election. After the Conservatives had a majority on the council from 1976 to 1986, no party had overall control from 1986 until the 2002 election when the Conservatives regained control. The Conservatives held their majority until the last election in 2019 when the council returned to no overall control. The council is currently composed of the following councillors:-

Parishes
The district contains the following civil parishes:

Bapchild
Bobbing
Borden
Boughton-under-Blean
Bredgar
Conyer
Danaway
Doddington
Dunkirk
Eastchurch
Eastling
Faversham
Goodnestone
Graveney
Hartlip
Hernhill
Iwade
Leysdown
Lower Halstow
Lynsted
Kemsley
Milstead
Milton Regis
Minster-on-Sea
Murston
Newington
Newnham
Norton, Buckland and Stone
Oare
Ospringe
Rodmersham
Rushenden
Selling
Sheldwich, Badlesmere and Leaveland
Stalisfield
Teynham
Throwley
Tonge
Tunstall
Upchurch
Warden

References

External links
Bored In Swale - an information site listing activities for the youth in Swale.

 
Non-metropolitan districts of Kent
Boroughs in England